Avenue Victor-Hugo is an avenue in the 16th arrondissement of Paris. It begins at place Charles de Gaulle (also known as the Étoile) and ends at place Tattegrain (becoming avenue Henri-Martin). It is one of the twelve avenues beginning at the Étoile, and the second longest of the twelve, after the avenue des Champs-Élysées.

Its junction with the Étoile is between those of the avenue Foch and avenue Kléber. It runs along the colline de Chaillot. Halfway along it is place Victor-Hugo and the Line 2 Metro station Victor Hugo. Originally named avenue de Saint-Cloud, it was renamed avenue Victor Hugo in 1881.

Crossing the whole northern part of the 16th arrondissement, over 1.825 km from the Étoile to the Muette, it is an average of 36m wide (its first part, between the Étoile and the place Victor-Hugo, is wider than the second part, between place Victor Hugo and place Tattegrain). Planted with trees and decorated with a statue of its namesake at the junction with avenue Henri-Martin, it is one of the most prestigious avenues in Paris.

It includes several buildings by Pierre Humbert, such as numbers 122 and 167 (the latter built in 1911 for Humbert's family). Humbert also built number 124, on the site of the hôtel particulier where Victor Hugo spent his last days (having as his address "Mr Victor Hugo, In his avenue, in Paris").

The Avenue was renamed after Hugo on 28 February 1881 (the day after his 79th birthday). The 1907 building's magnificent façade won several prizes and includes a sculpture of Hugo's face by Fonquergne. The Haitian president Lysius Salomon died at number 3 on 19 October 1888.

References

See also 
 16th arrondissement of Paris

16th arrondissement of Paris
Victor Hugo
Victor Hugo